= Karen A. Robinson =

Canadian-American epidemiologist

Academic background
- Education: BS, 1988, BA, 1989, McMaster University; M.Sc., 1992, University of Waterloo; PhD, Epidemiology, 2009, Johns Hopkins Bloomberg School of Public Health

Karen A. Robinson is a Canadian-American epidemiologist. She is a professor of medicine at Johns Hopkins University and Director of the school's Evidence-based Practice Center.

== Early life and education ==
Robinson earned her Bachelor of Science and Bachelor of Arts degrees from McMaster University and her master's degree in the University of Waterloo. Following this, she moved to the United States for her PhD in epidemiology from Johns Hopkins Bloomberg School of Public Health.

== Career ==
Upon completing her master's of science degree, Robinson became the co-director of the Johns Hopkins University's Evidence Based Practice Center in 2002. While serving as director, the Evidence Based Practice Center was selected by the United States Department of Health and Human Services' Agency for Healthcare Research and Quality to participate in their Evidence-Based Practice Center IV Program. As a result, they received a five-year contract to "promote evidence-based decision-making and research." In 2009, Robinson joined the faculty at Johns Hopkins University School of Medicine as an Assistant Professor of General Internal Medicine.

During the 2019–20 academic year, Robinson was promoted to full professor of medicine at Johns Hopkins and received an appointment to the National Academies of Science, Engineering and Medicine (NASEM) Committee to Review EPA's TSCA Systematic Review Guidance Document.
